The Mount Pleasant Mental Health Institute was a psychiatric institution located in Mount Pleasant, Iowa, USA. Originally known as the Iowa Lunatic Asylum, it opened in 1861. It is located on the same campus as The Mount Pleasant Correctional Facility. There was also a labyrinth of tunnels which connect every building. It was the first asylum in Iowa and was built under the Kirkbride Plan.

History
It was constructed between 1855 and 1865 at a cost of $400,000. The first patient was admitted in February 1861. It is a Kirkbride building, and was the first asylum in Iowa. The Mount Pleasant Mental Health Institute is the oldest of the four Iowa Department of Human Services facilities serving persons affected by mental illness.

In 1936, a fire destroyed most of the administration section, leaving only a kitchen area at the back. In 1946, the facility reached its peak occupancy of 1,581 patients. Since 1945, new therapies and medications had helped to lower the facility's population, and the individual's average length of stay was reduced from years to a matter of weeks.

This allowed the facility to release many of its patients and eventually reassign the patients to Cherokee Mental Health Institute (Cherokee, Iowa), Clarinda Treatment Complex (Clarinda, Iowa) and Independence State Hospital (Independence, Iowa), which are still in use today. It has been known by many names, including the Mount Pleasant Insane Asylum, the Mount Pleasant Hospital for the Insane and the Mount Pleasant Mental Health Institute.

Iowa Governor Terry Branstad announced that he would close Mount Pleasant and Clarinda MHIs in 2015. of these shut-downs, Branstad appears immovable. There are plans to develop a "crisis line", which will treat chronic mental health disorders like schizophrenia.

The architect of the building, Thomas Story Kirkbride, had an inclusive plan for such structures, including the requirement that staff live on or near the premises and that "guests" be assigned meaningful work.  More than thirty such structures still remain.

References

External links
 Kirkbride Buildings: Mount Pleasant State Hospital

Hospital buildings completed in 1861
Defunct hospitals in Iowa
Buildings and structures in Henry County, Iowa
Hospitals established in 1855
Psychiatric hospitals in Iowa
Kirkbride Plan hospitals
1855 establishments in Iowa